Richard "Dick" LaClede Stockton (born February 18, 1951) is a former professional tennis player from the United States. In addition to his playing career, he was the head coach of the men's tennis team at the University of Virginia. for three years, from 1998-2001. Stockton also served as the Head Men's Tennis Coach at Piedmont College in Demorest, GA from 2018-2021.

Stockton's highest world ranking was world No. 8. He reached the semifinals of Wimbledon in 1974, the quarterfinals of the U.S. Open in 1976 and 1977 and the semifinals in the 1978 French Open. Stockton played on the U.S. Davis Cup Team five times (1973, 1975, 1976, 1977, 1979), including the U.S. Davis Cup Championship Team in 1979.

Career finals

Singles: 18 (8 titles – 10 runners-up)

Doubles: 31 (16 titles – 15 runners-up)

Notes

References

External links
 
 
 

1951 births
Living people
American male tennis players
American tennis coaches
Sportspeople from Charlottesville, Virginia
Tennis people from Virginia
Trinity Tigers men's tennis players
Grand Slam (tennis) champions in mixed doubles
US Open (tennis) champions
French Open champions